Clea hidalgoi is a Southeast Asian species of freshwater snail with an operculum, an aquatic gastropod mollusk in the family Nassariidae, most of which are marine.

Distribution 
Clea hidalgoi occurs on Balabac Island, the westernmost island of the Palawan province in the Philippines.

Feeding habits 
Like all snails in the clade Neogastropoda, this species is carnivorous. It feeds on different types of worms and gastropods, often eating other, larger snails after burying themselves and ambushing their prey.

Reproduction 
Clea hidalgoi consists of defined male and female genders, and is not capable of gender change. It is unknown as to how to sex these animals. Both males and females seem to be the same size and shape. When a male and female mate, they lock together for 8–12 hours.

References

 Houbrick R.S. (1986) Transfer of Quadrasia from the Planaxidae to the Buccinidae (Mollusca: Gastropoda: Prosobranchia). Proceedings of the Biological Society of Washington 99(2): 359-362

External links
 Smith E.A. (1895) Observations on the genus Clea, with the description of a new species. Proceedings of the Malacological Society of London 1: 251-253
 Strong E.E., Galindo L.A. & Kantor Yu.I. (2017). Quid est Clea helena? Evidence for a previously unrecognized radiation of assassin snails (Gastropoda: Buccinoidea: Nassariidae). PeerJ. 5: e3638.

Nassariidae
Gastropods described in 1886